A pipecutter is a type of tool used by plumbers to cut pipe. Besides producing a clean cut, the tool is often a faster, cleaner, and more convenient way of cutting pipe than using a hacksaw, although this depends on the metal of the pipe.

There are two types of pipe cutters. Plastic tubing cutters, which really look much like a pair of pruning shears, may be used for thinner pipes and tubes, such as sprinkler pipe.  For use on thicker pipes, there is a pipecutter with a sharp wheel and adjustable jaw grips. These are used by rotating it around the pipe and repeatedly tightening it until it cuts all of the way through.

Pipecutters vs. hacksaws
Hacksaws will cut nearly any size pipe made out of metals and plastics. Pipecutters, on the other hand, are more limited. In the situations where they work, they are generally accepted to leave cleaner cuts on the outer surface of the tube. The cut can leave a burr around the inside of the tube. This burr should be cleaned or reamed when cutting electrical conduit to prevent stripping of the insulating coating from the wires.  In fluid handling applications, the burr should also be removed, as it can restrict the flow and cause turbulence.

References

Cutting tools
American inventions